The 14th Busan International Film Festival was held from October 8 to October 16, 2009, in Busan, South Korea.

A total of 355 films from over 70 countries were screened, beating the record set in the last festival. With a total attendance of 173,516, it had 98 world premieres and 46 international premieres.

The 9.9 billion won event opened with the South Korean film Good Morning President, directed by  Jang Jin and closed with the Chinese film The Message, directed by Chen Kuo-fu and Gao Qunshu.

Program
† World premiere
†† International premiere

Opening Film

Gala Presentation

A Window on Asian Cinema
{| class="sortable wikitable" width="90%" cellpadding="5"
|-
!width="30%"| English title
!width="40%"| Original title
!width="20%"| Director(s)
!width="10%"| Production country/countries
!width="3%"| 
|-
| 15 Malaysia ||   || 
Woo Ming Jin
Jordan Suleiman
Kamal Sabran
Ho Yuhang
Liew Seng Tat
Benji Lim
Mussadique Suleiman
Ron Nam
Bahir Yeusuff
Khairil Bahar
Johan John
Linus Chung
Desmond Ng
James Lee
Yasmin Ahmad
Amir Muhammad

|| Malaysia ||†
|-
| A White Night || 白夜Byakuya || Masahiro Kobayashi || Japan ||††
|-
| Accident || 意外Yì Wài || Soi Cheang || Hong Kong ||
|-
| Adrift || Chơi vơi || Bui Thac Chuyen|| Vietnam ||
|-
| Affliction ||   || Richard Somes || Philippines||
|-
| Air Doll || 空気人形Kūki Ningyō || Hirokazu Koreeda || Japan ||
|-
| Ashkan, the Charmed Ring and Other Stories || اشکان، انگشتر متبرک و چند داستان دیگرAshkan, angoshtar-e motebarek va dastan-haye digar || Shahram Mokri || Iran ||††
|-
| At the End of Daybreak || 心魔Shah Mo || YuHang Ho || MalaysiaHong Kong||
|-
| Between Two Worlds || Ahasin Wetei || Vimukthi Jayasundara || Sri LankaFrance||
|-
| City of Life and Death || 南京! 南京!Nanjing! Nanjing!|| Lu Chuan || China ||
|-
| Children Metal Divers || Bakal Boys(lit. Metal Boys)|| Raltson Jover || Philippines ||
|-
| Dear Doctor || ディア・ドクターDia Dokuta || Miwa Nishikawa || Japan ||
|-
| Don't Burn || Đừng Đốt || Đặng Nhật Minh || Vietnam ||
|-
| Face || || Tsai Ming-liang || TaiwanFrance ||
|-
| God Lives in The Himalayas ||   || Sanjay Srinivas || NepalIndia||††
|-
| Happiness of Kati || ความสุขของกะท || Genwaii Thongdeenok || Thailand ||
|-
| Here || || Tzu Nyen Ho || Singapore ||
|-
| Herman ||  || Hussein Hassan || Iraq ||†
|-
| How Are You, Dad? || 爸...你好嗎? || Chang Tso-chi || Taiwan ||††
|-
| Judge' || 透析Tou Xi|| Jie Liu || China ||
|-
| Kanikōsen || 蟹工船 || Hiroyuki Tanaka || Japan ||†
|-
| Karaoke || || Chris Chong Chan Fui || Malaysia ||
|-
| Karat 14 ||   || Parviz Shahbazi || IranGermany ||††
|-
| Kelin ||  || Yermek Tursunov || Kazakhstan ||
|-
| Killer Bride's Perfect Crime || キラー・ヴァージンロードKira Vajin Rodo(lit. Killer Virgin Road)|| Goro Kishitani  || Japan ||††
|-
| Itsuji Itao's King of the Escape || || Itsuji Itao || Japan ||††
|-
| Letters to an Angel ||  || Ermek Shinarbayev || Kazakhstan ||
|-
| Lola ||  || Brillante Mendoza || Philippines ||
|-
| Memory of Love || 重来 || Wang Chao || ChinaFrance ||
|-
| Night and Fog || 天水圍的夜與霧 || Ann Hui || Hong Kong ||
|-
| Nymph || นางไม้Nang mai || Pen-Ek Ratanaruang || Thailand ||
|-
| One Night in Supermarket || 夜·店Yè Diàn(lit. Night, Shop) || Yang Qing || China ||
|-
| Opium War || جنگ تریاک || Siddiq Barmak || AfghanistanJapanSouth KoreaFrance ||
|-
| Parade || パレードParedo || Isao Yukisada || Japan ||†
|-
| Prince of Tears || 淚王子Lei wangzi || Yonfan || TaiwanHong Kong||
|-
| Sailor of Hearts || കുട്ടിസ്രാങ്ക്Kutty Srank || Shaji N. Karun || India ||
|-
| Sawasdee Bangkok || สวัสดีบางกอก, เสน่ห์กรุงเทพ || 
Pen-Ek Ratanaruang
Kongdej Jaturanrasamee
Wisit Sasanatieng
Aditya Assarat

|| Thailand ||
|-
| Sun Spots || || Yang Heng || ChinaHong Kong ||
|-
| Taipei 24H ||  || 
Lee Kang-sheng
Niu Chen-zer
Debbie Hsu
Lee Chi Y
Chen Dj Yin-jung
Cheng Fen-Fen
Cheng Hsiao-tse
An Jeyi

|| Taiwan ||††
|-
| Talentime ||  || Yasmin Ahmad || Malaysia ||
|-
| Tears || 眼泪Yan Lei || Cheng Wen-tang || Taiwan ||†
|-
| Tetsuo: The Bullet Man || 鉄男　THE BULLET MAN || Shinya Tsukamoto || Japan ||
|-
| Thanks Maa ||  || Freddie WongIrfan Kamal || India ||
|-
| The Blue Mansion || || Glen Goei || SingaporeMalaysia||†
|-
| The Legend is Alive || Huyền thoại bất tử || Luu Huynh || Vietnam ||
|-
| The Rainbow Troops || Laskar Pelangi || Riri Riza || Indonesia ||
|-
| The Two Horses of Genghis Khan || || Byambasuren Davaa || Germany ||
|-
| The Warmest ||  || Wulan Tana || China ||†
|-
| Third Person Singular Number || || Mostofa Sarwar Farooki || Bangladesh ||†
|-
| Toad's Oil || ガマの油Gama no Abura || Kōji Yakusho || Japan ||
|-
| Weaving Girl || 纺织姑娘fǎng zhī gū niáng || Wang Quan'an || China||
|-
| Where Are You? || ワカラナイWakaranai || Masahiro Kobayashi || Japan ||
|-
| Woman On Fire Looks For Water || 물을 찾는 불위의 여자Muleul Chatneun Bulwiui Yeoja || Woo Ming Jin || MalaysiaSouth Korea ||†
|-
| Yang Yang || 阳阳 || Yuchieh Cheng || Taiwan ||
|}

New Currents

Korean Cinema Today - Panorama

Korean Cinema Today - Vision

Korean Cinema Retrospective

Archeology of Korean Cinema

Ha Kil-chong, The Dreamer for New Cinema

Remembering Yu Hyun-mok

World Cinema

Flash Forward

Wide Angle
Korean Short Film Competition

Asian Short Film Competition

Short Film Showcase

Documentary Competition

Documentary Showcase

Animation Showcase

Open Cinema

Special Program in Focus
Johnnie To: The Hood in the City

Mabuhay! Pinoy Indi - Cinema!

Yash Chopra: Asian Filmmaker of the Year

Ani-Asia!: A Leap of Asian Feature Animation 4

Dario Argento Falling in Giallo : Truth of the Invisible

HA Kil-chong and New American Cinema: Searching for New Languagesa

Special Commemoration of the Late Jang Jin-young - Remembering the Films of a Beautiful Actress

Midnight Passion

Closing Film

Awards
New Currents AwardKick Off - Shawkat Amin Korki (Iraq/Japan)I'm in Trouble! - So Sang-min (South Korea)
Special Mention: Squalor - Giuseppe Bede Sampedro (Philippines)
Flash Forward Award - Last Cowboy Standing - Zaida Bergroth (Finland/Germany)
Special Mention - Miss Kicki - Håkon Liu (Sweden/Taiwan)
Korean Cinema Award
Riccardo Gelli (Director of Korea Film Festival in Florence, Italy)
Jeannette Paulson Hereniko (President of Asia Pacific Film.com, Former Director of Hawaii International Film Festival, USA)
Asian Filmmaker of the Year - Yash Chopra (Director & Producer, India)
Sonje AwardSomewhere Unreached - Kim Jae-won (South Korea)Rare Fish - Basil Vassili Mironer (Singapore/Indonesia)
BIFF Mecenat AwardEarth's Women - Kwon Woo-jung (South Korea)The Other Song - Saba Dewan (India)
FIPRESCI Award - Kick Off - Shawkat Amin Korki (Iraq/Japan)
NETPAC Award - Paju - Park Chan-ok (South Korea)
KNN Audience Award - Lan'' - Jiang Wenli (China)

References

External links
Official site

Busan International Film Festival
Busan International Film Festival, 2009
Busan International Film Festival, 2009
Busan International Film Festival, 2009
2009 festivals in South Korea